A Touch Away may refer to:
 A Touch Away (TV series), a 2006 Israeli television miniseries
 Bemerhak Negia Mikan or A Touch Away, a 2005 album by Izhar Ashdot
 "A Touch Away", a song by Deep Purple from the album Purpendicular